Derek Reginald Bell  (born 31 October 1941 in Pinner, Middlesex, England) is a British racing driver. In sportscar racing, he won the Le Mans 24 hours five times, the Daytona 24 three times and the World Sportscar Championship twice. He also raced in Formula One for the Ferrari, Wheatcroft, McLaren, Surtees and Tecno teams. He has been described by fellow racer Hans-Joachim Stuck as one of the most liked drivers of his generation.

Early career

Bell grew up on a farm and helped to run the Church Farm caravan site, complete with its own pub, near Pagham Harbour, boarding at The King's School, Worcester. He was encouraged by his stepfather Bernard Hender to take up racing with a Lotus Seven in 1964. He won his first race in the Lotus at Goodwood in March of that year. He graduated to Formula Three in the following year racing a Lotus 31 and in 1966 switched to a Lotus 41 scoring his first victory, again at Goodwood. In 1967 he enjoyed seven wins. He entered Formula Two in a privateer Brabham BT23C fielded by his stepfather's Church Farm Racing team and after several promising performances, which caught Enzo Ferrari's eye, made his Formula One Grand Prix debut for Ferrari at Monza in 1968. He contested the 1969 Tasman Series in a 2.4 Dino and was second at Lakeside to Amon and Rindt at Warwick Farm. In 1969 he raced the four-wheel-drive McLaren M9A in its only ever race at the British Grand Prix at Silverstone.

Bell took part in the filming of Le Mans (1970) starring Steve McQueen, and he and his family lived with the McQueen family during the filming, the two becoming friends. Bell had a lucky escape during the making of the film. The Ferrari 512 he was driving suddenly caught fire whilst getting into position for a take. He managed to get out of the car just before it was engulfed in flames and suffered minor burns. Although the car was badly damaged, it was later rebuilt and is still racing at historic meets.

Bell finished second in the 1970 European Formula Two Championship, driving a Brabham BT30 for Wheatcroft Racing. In 1972 he got a drive in the Tecno Formula One team, along with Nanni Galli. He later raced a number of times for the Surtees team, including a sixth place at the 1970 United States Grand Prix racing a Surtees TS7, which was to be his highest finish in the Formula One World Championship. He had a few further drives for Surtees in 1974 and finished 11th in the 1974 German Grand Prix. Enjoying single seaters more than sports cars he accepted drives in F5000/Libre British Shellsport series and F5000 in 1976-7 the Penske PC7 March and also odd F5000 drives in the US and Australia.

It was to be in sports car racing, which he came to via a drive in Jacques Swaters privately entered Ferrari 512M in the 1970 Spa 1000 km, leading to a Ferrari works drive at the 1970 Le Mans 24 hours, where he built a strong reputation as a world class and world championship winning racer.

Le Mans
Bell won the Le Mans 24 hours race five times, in 1975, 1981, 1982, 1986 and 1987, making him the most successful British driver in the race to date. He was teamed with the Belgian Jacky Ickx in 1975, racing the Gulf Mirage GR8, again in 1981, racing a Porsche 936, and finally in 1982 racing a Rothmans Porsche 956. Bell went on to win the 1986 and 1987 Le Mans teamed with Hans-Joachim Stuck and Al Holbert racing a Rothmans Porsche 962. 

His first Le Mans was in 1970 in a works-entered Ferrari 512, with co-driver Ronnie Peterson, his last in 1996 racing a McLaren F1 GTR. Bell achieved his highest ever speed at Le Mans at the 1971 Le Mans 24 hours April test day, reaching a calculated top speed of 246 mph on the Mulsanne Straight in the JW Gulf Porsche 917LH.

Sportscar racing
Bell also won the World Sportscar Championship title twice in 1985 and 1986 and the 24 Hours of Daytona three times in 1986, 1987 and 1989. He won the 1973 Silverstone RAC Tourist Trophy racing a BMW 3.0CSL with Harald Ertl. In 1984 he won the Nürburgring 1000km with Stefan Bellof, racing a Porsche 956, with a notable fourth place in the 1974 Nürburgring 1000km racing a Gulf GR7 with James Hunt on the longer 22.8 km circuit.

His first victory in the Spa 1000km came in 1974 racing a Mirage M6 with Mike Hailwood, going onto win the 1975 and 1984 editions, with Henri Pescarolo, in 1975, in that season's dominant Alfa Romeo Tipo 33TT12 on the old 14 km track and with Stefan Bellof, in the equally dominant Porsche 956 of 1984, on the shorter circuit used by Formula One. He is also one of two drivers to win the Spa 1000km on both the original and current circuits, the other being Jacky Ickx.

Post-racing career
Bell was hired as chairman for the Spectre R42 super car project between 1996 and its demise in 1997. In 2001 he was hired to consult for the Bentley Speed 8 programme, helping Bentley to win Le Mans two years later. He now splits his time between the United States and his home near Chichester, UK, with his wife Misti. He is an after dinner speaker and motorsport commentator, and also races in historic events, and is a global ambassador for Bentley. Bell is also an operating partner of Bentley Naples in Naples, Florida, USA.

His eldest son Justin Bell is also a racer. The two raced together in the 1991 24 Hours of Daytona, and the 1992 24 Hours of Le Mans. Bell was to race in the 2008 24 Hours of Daytona with Justin, however the car dropped out of the race early and Derek did not get to run in the race. Aside from winning at Le Mans five times, he claims his proudest moment was coming third with his son Justin racing the Harrods sponsored McLaren F1 GTR in the 1995 Le Mans on Fathers Day.

Bell is a patron for the charities Dementia Support, Hope for Tomorrow, Mission Motorsport and the Henry Surtees Foundation. He is also an Ambassador for the Fly Navy Heritage Trust.

He is currently the president of the oldest pram race in the world. The Pagham Pram Race started in 1946 and is run annually at 11am on Boxing Day.

Bell returned to Le Mans to race a Porsche 962 for the first time in 20 years in the Group C support race at Le Mans on 16 June 2012.

He was presented with Honorary Life membership of the AA in recognition of his 50 years in motorsport, commemorated by a plaque presented by Lord March at the Moving Motorshow during the 2014 Goodwood Festival of Speed in the presence of Chris Jansen, CEO of the AA, and Edmund King, the president of the AA.

Bell was the grand marshal at the 2014 Silverstone 6 Hours, 2010 Twelve Hours of Sebring and 2021 24 hours of Le Mans.

Awards
BRDC Gold Star: 1984, 1985, 1986 and 1987
Royal Automobile Club Plaque d'Honneur: 1985
Guild of Motoring Writers Driver of the Year: 1982 and 1985
Bell was awarded the MBE in 1986 for services to motorsport.
Inducted into the Motorsports Hall of Fame of America in 2012.
Inducted into the Le Mans 24 Hours Drivers Hall of Fame in 2013.
 Inducted in to the Motor Sport Hall of Fame UK in 2016
 Presented with Honorary Life Membership of the AA in recognition of his 50 years in motorsport at the 2014 Goodwood Festival of Speed
 was made citizen of honor of the city of Angoulême in 2017
2017 Simeone Foundation Spirit of Competition Award

Racing record

Career summary

† As Bell was a guest driver, he was ineligible for championship points.

Complete European Formula Two Championship results
(key) (Races in bold indicate pole position; races in italics indicate fastest lap)

Complete Formula One World Championship results
(key)

Complete Formula One Non-Championship results
(key)

Complete Tasman Series results
(key)

Complete European F5000 Championship results
(key) (Races in bold indicate pole position; races in italics indicate fastest lap.)

Complete Shellsport International Series results
(key) (Races in bold indicate pole position; races in italics indicate fastest lap)

Complete 24 Hours of Le Mans results

Complete British Saloon Car Championship results
(key) (Races in bold indicate pole position; races in italics indicate fastest lap.)

Complete Bathurst 1000 results

Complete WRC results

References

External links 

 Derek Bell MBE – Official Web Site

1941 births
Living people
People educated at King's School, Worcester
English racing drivers
English Formula One drivers
Ferrari Formula One drivers
McLaren Formula One drivers
Surtees Formula One drivers
Tecno Formula One drivers
24 Hours of Le Mans winning drivers
International Race of Champions drivers
European Formula Two Championship drivers
Tasman Series drivers
Brighton Speed Trials people
People from Pinner
BRDC Gold Star winners
Members of the Order of the British Empire
People from Bognor Regis
24 Hours of Daytona drivers
World Sportscar Championship drivers
Goodwood estate
Bentley
Japanese Sportscar Championship drivers
Porsche Motorsports drivers
Team Joest drivers
Audi Sport drivers
David Price Racing drivers